Sreeja is an Indian actress who acts mostly in Malayalam movies. Her lead roles in Indrajaalam as Mohanlal's heroine and Cheriya Lokavum Valiya Manushyarum are well noted. She had acted only in few movies.

Early life
Sreeja is born to theater artists Sreedharan and Usha on 18 April 1971 at Thiruvananthapuram, Kerala. She has acted in few dramas along with her parents before coming to movie industry.

Career
She made her debut as child artist with Nidhi, a Malayalam movie in 1982. She continued to act in small roles after that. She acted as sister to Kamalahasan in Chanakyan and Jayaram in Mazhavil Kavadi. Later in 1989 she made her heroine debut with Annakutty Kodambakkam Vilikkunnu, the first movie directed by Jagathy Sreekumar. Then she went on to act heroine to many actors including Mohanlal in Indrajalam and Mukesh in Cheriya Lokavum Valiya Manushyarum and Kazhchakkappuram. She had her primary education from Karthika Thirunal Government Vocational Higher Secondary School For Girls, Thiruvananthapuram and bachelors from NSS Arts College For Women, Thiruvananthapuram.

Personal life

She is married to Sandhana Pandian who is from Tamil Nadu, co-star of her film Sevvanthi since 2 June 1993. The couple have a son and a daughter.

Filmography

TV serials
 Oru Poo Viriyunnu (Doordarshan)
 Manushyabandhangal (Doordarshan)
 Kanakachilanka
 Ithikasa kathaigal (Raj TV) as Shakunthala

References

External links

 sreeja sandhanapandian on Facebook
 Sreeja at MSI

Actresses in Malayalam cinema
Indian film actresses
Actresses in Tamil cinema
Living people
1971 births
Actresses from Thiruvananthapuram
20th-century Indian actresses
Actresses in Malayalam television
Actresses in Tamil television